República Deportiva is a weekly one-hour sports show on the Spanish-language American television network Univision. The program airs on every Sunday.

History
República Deportiva was initially hosted by Fernando Fiore, Rosana Franco, and Jorge Gómez in 1998. Gómez left the show in 2004 and was replaced by Félix Fernández, a former professional goalkeeper for the Mexico national football team. Franco was dismissed from the show in 2012, and Fiore's departure followed in 2014. In that same year, Lindsay Casinelli and Adriana Monsalve officially joined the program to fill the vacant positions. Julián Gil officially replaced Fiore as the show's main host in 2015. In October 2016 Mané de la Parra joined as the show's host on occasions when Gil cannot appear.

Content
República Deportiva primarily covers sports favored by the predominantly Hispanic audience, though it also dedicates segments to sports and events outside the liking of the target demographic. Football (soccer) is heavily covered and analyzed, highlighting matches from leagues in Europe and the Americas such as the Premier League, Liga MX, Major League Soccer, and La Liga. Focus is also placed on popular sports like baseball (MLB), boxing, mixed martial arts, and  basketball. There is also some time dedicated to other sports popular solely in North America such as gridiron football and Formula One racing. Usually notable sportspeople and coaches/managers from past and present are interviewed and even invited to the show.

The show features many segments including the popular "Pregúntale a Felix" (or "Ask Felix"), where fans send in football-related questions. Contests are also a large part of the program such as "Miss República Deportiva" and "El Sabio de la República." The Senadoras, scantily-clad television presenters, are hugely popular. Notable "Senadoras" include Alba Galindo and Natalia Saenz, both of whom departed from the show in 2015 after long tenures.

Awards
For República Deportiva's 20th Anniversary in 2019, Broadcasting & Cable and Multichannel News presented República Deportiva with the Award for Outstanding Achievement in Hispanic Television Programming at the 17th Annual Hispanic Television Summit, produced by Schramm Marketing Group.

References

External links 
 
 

American sports television series
Univision original programming
1999 American television series debuts
2016 American television series endings
2000s American television series